Andrei Iakovlev (born 18 August 1992) is a Russian tennis player.

Iakovlev has a career high ATP singles ranking of 1415 achieved on 20 September 2010.

Iakovlev made his ATP main draw debut at the 2010 St. Petersburg Open in the doubles draw partnering Alexander Zhurbin.

References

External links

1992 births
Living people
Russian male tennis players
Sportspeople from Saint Petersburg